The Titular See of Aqua Flaviae is a former diocese in the Portuguese district of Vial Real and current titular seat of Chaves.

History
Around 350 A.D., Aquae Flaviae was suffragan diocese of the Archdiocese of Braga. The only recorded reference to a bishop was Idácio de Chaves, and the bishopric was suppressed in 711.

The diocese was nominally restored in 1969 as a Latin titular bishopric, and had the following incumbents, of the lowest (episcopal) rank:
 Lino Aguirre Garcia (20 August 1969 – 31 December 1970)
 Rubén Buitrago Trujillo, Augustinian Recollects (O.A.R.) (25 February 1971 – 8 July 1974)
 Stephen Naidoo, Holy Ghost Fathers (C.SS.R.) (2 August 1974 – 20 October 1984), as Auxiliary Bishop of Cape Town (South Africa) (1 July 1974 – 20 October 1984), later succeeding as Archbishop of Cape Town (20 October 1984 – 1 July 1989)
 Édouard Mununu Kasiala, Trappists (O.C.S.O) (8 November 1984 – 10 March 1986)
 Luis Augusto Castro Quiroga, Consolata Missionaries (I.M.C.) (17 October 1986 – 2 February 1998), as Apostolic Vicar of San Vicente–Puerto Leguízamo (Colombia) (17 October 1986 – 2 February 1998), later Metropolitan Archbishop of Tunja (Colombia) (2 February 1998 to the present), President of Episcopal Conference of Colombia (5 July 2005 – 3 July 2008), also Apostolic Administrator of Duitama–Sogamoso (Colombia) (15 October 2012 – 18 April 2015), President of Episcopal Conference of Colombia (9 July 2014 to the present)
 Vicente Costa (1 July 1998 – 9 October 2002)
 Manuel da Rocha Felício (21 October 2002 – 21 December 2004)
 Anacleto Cordeiro Gonçalves de Oliveira (4 February 2005 – 11 June 2010)
 Pio Gonçalo Alves de Sousa (18 February 2011 to the present), Auxiliary Bishop of Porto

References

External links 
 GigaCatholic with incumbent biography links

Chaves, Portugal
Catholic titular sees in Europe
de:Aquae Flaviae
it:Aquae Flaviae